William Lodewyk Crowther FRCS (15 April 1817 − 12 April 1885) was a Tasmanian politician, who was Premier of Tasmania from 20 December 1878 to 29 October 1879.

His careers in medicine, politics, and business were overshadowed in modern times by his role in the unsanctioned exhumation and decapitation of William Lanne’s body. Lanne was believed to be the last “full-blooded” Aboriginal Tasmanian male and after the exhumation, his skull was sent by Crowther to the Royal College of Surgeons in London for preservation.

Early life
Crowther was born in Haarlem, Netherlands, as the elder child of Dr. William Crowther who was later a long-time resident surgeon of Hobart. The Crowthers moved to Van Diemen's Land (now Tasmania) in 1824.

Crowther was educated at Richard B. Claiborne's Grammar School in Longford, Tasmania in 1828. On his 120-mile (193 km) walks to and from school in holidays, Crowther developed a strong interest in natural history. 

Crowther was subsequently apprenticed as an apothecarist in Hobart but without qualifications. After the death of his father in 1839, William Crowther continued his medical studies in England. He famously travelled from Hobart with a large collection of Tasmanian fauna, which included potoroos, black-faced wallabies, a pair of Tasmanian devils and 493 skins. This collection was sold to the Earl of Derby which allowed him to pay his fees at St Thomas's Hospital (M.R.C.S., L.R.C.P., 1841) and a year of study in Paris. 

In 1842, William Crowther returned to Hobart and took over his father’s former practice.

Business interests
Crowther engaged in various commercial enterprises in Tasmania. He was a shipowner, had sawmills on the Huon River and shipped lumber from Tasmania to other Australian colonies and New Zealand. He sent ships to collect guano from islands in the Coral Sea and engaged in sealing and pelagic whaling from Hobart.

Political career
Crowther was elected to the Tasmanian House of Assembly in October 1866, but resigned his seat in December 1866. On 22 March 1869, he was elected to the Tasmanian Legislative Council as a representative of Hobart and held this seat until his death. He was a constant attendant and an able speaker. In July 1876 he joined the Thomas Reibey cabinet as a minister without portfolio, and on 20 December 1878 became premier. The state of the political parties at that time made it practically impossible to do anything constructive. Crowther resigned on 29 October 1879.

Removal of Indigenous remains
Crowther is noted for mutilating the remains of William Lanne, a Tasmanian Aboriginal man, in 1869. He removed Lanne's skull and sent it to the Royal College of Surgeons in London. He was suspended from his role as honorary medical officer at the Hobart General Hospital over charges arising from this mutilation. An inquiry showed that two mutilations had taken place, the first at the Colonial Hospital, the other at the cemetery the night of the burial. Drs Crowther and G. Stokell, resident medical officer at the hospital, were suspected of the first, the Royal Society of Tasmania of the second. A petition with 48 pages of closely-packed signatures was sent to Governor (Sir) Charles Du Cane seeking annulment of Crowther's suspension, without success.

Crowther threatened violence when challenged about his actions by then Premier Alfred Kennerley in the Tasmanian Parliament in August 1873:

Sources have speculated Crowther's involvement in the 1907 exhumation of other Aboriginal Tasmanians, notably a girl named Mathinna. This claim is unlikely as Crowther had died nearly 30 years earlier. Update: Crowther's grandson, Sir William Edward Lodewyk Hamilton Crowther (1887–1981), was the Dr Crowther who exhumed multiple Tasmania Aboriginal people's skeletal remains in 1908, and eventually, remorsefully admitted to his actions.

Death and legacy
Crowther died in Hobart on 12 April 1885, three days before his 68th birthday. He was survived by his wife Victoria Marie Louise, daughter of General Muller, and their eight children. One of his sons, Edward Crowther, was a member of the Tasmanian parliament from 1878 to 1912.

In 1935 W. L. Crowther's face mask joined those of other eminent Australians in the gallery of the Institute of Anatomy in Canberra.

The W. L. Crowther Library was named in his memory, and presented to the State Library of Tasmania by his grandson Sir William Crowther (1887–1981), son of Edward, in 1964.

Despite a long life involving many other endeavours and achievements in his adopted home and abroad, according to historian Helen Patricia MacDonald, referring to the theft of Lanne's remains, "the events of 1869 came to define William Crowther's place in Tasmanian history".

Statue

A bronze statue of Crowther was erected in Franklin Square, Hobart, on 9 January 1889, funded by public subscription. The inscription reads:  

On 15 August 2022 the Hobart City Council voted 7 to 4 in favour of removing Crowther's statue from public display in Franklin Square, as an act of reconciliation. Lord Mayor, Anna Reynolds, said "[This] does not change history", adding that the records and stories remained unchanged; however, "We don't want to celebrate a time in our history when scientists and doctors wanted to prove theories of European superiority". She said that the statue would be conserved, and that preliminary discussions had been held with the Tasmanian Museum and Art Gallery about moving it there.

References

External links

1817 births
1885 deaths
Premiers of Tasmania
Members of the Tasmanian House of Assembly
Members of the Tasmanian Legislative Council
Australian surgeons
Politicians from Haarlem
Fellows of the Royal College of Surgeons
19th-century Australian politicians
Australian people in whaling
Australian ship owners
Sealers
19th-century Australian businesspeople
Anti-indigenous racism in Australia